Jean-François de La Rocque de Roberval also named "l'élu de Poix" or sieur de Roberval (Carcassonne, c. 1495 – Paris, 1560) son of an unknown mother and Bernard de La Rocque military and former seneschal of Carcassonne. He was a French officer, appointed viceroy of Canada by Francis I and led the first French colonial attempt in the Saint Laurent valley in the first half of the 16th century with the explorer Jacques Cartier.

Family
The complexity of his origins and his family can be explained by the three known marriages of his father. The first marriage (1482–87) having given no descendants, the Sieur de Roberval would be the son of a second wife (between 1487 and 1499), who died in the childhood of J-F de La Rocque. His father's third marriage to Isabeau de Popincourt (who brought Roberval's possessions to La Rocques) resulted in the birth of three half-sisters and a half-brother: Marquise, Charlotte, Marie and Jean (Allaire, 2013, p. 20). 
Financially speaking, Roberval benefited from favorable patrimonial circumstances. In addition to the land and estate from his father's weddings, he inherited from close relatives who died childless. Its lands and lordships were scattered over three regions of the kingdom of France. The firsts in Languedoc near Carcassonne, the region of origin of the La Rocque family. The second in the Rethélois near Reims, from his father's first marriage. The latest and most famous, in Roberval in the Valois, between Compiègne, Chantilly and Senlis, where the title by which it has made history comes from.

Military career
As a soldier, La Rocque worked under the orders of Robert de La Mark-Fleurange, Marshal of France and chief of the armies of François Ier. He thus continued the family tradition of working under the orders of a Marshal of France. His membership in this regiment led him to travel, but above all to reside in the Rethélois where his garrison had its quarters. With La Marck, he joined the ranks of the king's military officers and participated in most of the conflicts of the time. He distinguished himself among others, in Pavia (1525), at the siege of Péronne in 1536 which blocked a Spanish attack towards Paris. At the end of the war of 1536-1538 he returned from Italy as a hero, but without its leader, Robert De La Marck (died in 1536) and half of his comrades killed in fighting with the Spaniards in 1537.

Attempt at colonizing Canada
It is probable that the Sieur de Roberval heard of the Canadian colonial project on his return to court in 1538. According to sources, he devoted himself to rebuilding his former regiment with the young son of Robert de La Mark. It remains that until 1540, François I refused all projects that could endanger his political negotiations with Charles V of Spain. But when this goodwill ceased in the fall of 1540, the French sovereign decided to increase the size of the original expedition and at the same time empty its overcrowded prisons. This first French colony will therefore include settlers, artisans and soldiers to protect the establishment from Amerindians or Spaniards and to supervise prisoners sentenced to hard labor. Jacques Cartier, unable to carry out all aspects of this mission, entrusted his organization to a lieutenant governor. The choice fell on La Rocque de Roberval which has the advantages of being a noble soldier, leader of a man who will not back down from the enemy, an engineer in fortifications and a master of mines in France, aspects useful for the future colony. The political context also contributed to his appointment, because in 1540 the Constable of Montmorency was in disgrace at Chantilly and Admiral Chabot was in prison for corruption. It is therefore to the La Marcks not tainted with conflicts of interest that Francis I turns to designate the applicant.

The preparations, already well advanced by Jacques Cartier, must constantly be readjusted, but things are going well. It remains that the military equipment of La Rocque, which is slow to arrive from its garrison in Champagne, gives rise to fears of a postponement of the expedition. To overcome this problem, La Rocque decided to send Cartier immediately to Canada with more than half of the fleet so that the colonial settlement would be ready when he came to join him. But when Cartier is at sea, tension escalates between France and Spain following the assassination of two French ambassadors by the Spaniards in Italy. The threatening war then encouraged La Rocque to stay in France to participate in the looming conflict. François I finally gives up starting hostilities and it is now too late to go to Canada. Roberval then decides to spend the winter on the tip of Brittany to retaliate an economic blockade of Spain by boarding ships and goods coming from Spain. La Rocque de Roberval set sail for Canada from La Rochelle the following spring, unaware that Spanish ships were sailing the Atlantic in search of them.

In Canada, Jacques Cartier, set up the colony of Charlesbourg-Royal a few kilometers upstream from Stadacona (Quebec city), at Cape Rouge. As planned, two forts were erected, one below by the Cap Rouge River and the other on the cliff to protect the colony from attacks from the river. During the work, Cartier took the opportunity to go back to Hochelaga (Montreal), but on his return a confrontation took place between the settlers and the Stadaconians. Result, thirty-five settlers killed by the Amerindians to avenge theirs killed or wounded by the French. After a winter, logically in a state of siege and not seeing La Rocque de Roberval coming, the sailor from Saint-Malo decides to pack up his bags with a few barrels filled with stones and minerals that he believes are precious in his holds. The Sieur de Roberval left La Rochelle on April 16, 1542 with three ships, and during a stop in Saint-John's in Newfoundland, Cartier found himself facing the ships from La Rocque on their way to the colony. Cartier may well explain his difficulties with the Stadaconians and show the so-called precious metals and gems, Roberval has nothing to do with it and orders Cartier and his people to return to the colony. But during the night, the latter decided instead to take to sea again, thus disobeying official orders. This decision will have serious consequences for the Saint-Malo sailor.

In her Heptaméron, the sister of the King of France, Marguerite of Navarre, reports that on their way to the colony, La Rocque forced a couple to disembark on a small island. Only the woman survived and was recovered the following year. By regaining control of the colony abandoned by Cartier and his team, the Sieur de Roberval renamed several places: the river became France Prime and the colony of Charlesbourg-Royal became France-Roy, etc. The latter restored the facilities at Cap-Rouge and renewed relations with the Stadaconians who supplied the French establishment. During the long winter, about fifty settlers died of scurvy, a clear sign that neither Cartier nor the Stadaconians had explained to them the recipe for Anneda which could cure this disease. In the spring, La Rocque took advantage of the good weather to go up the river to Hochelaga (Montreal) with seventy soldiers and settlers in eight boats to reach the mythical place that the Amerindians call the "Kingdom of Saguenay" hoping to find the mythical Northwest Passage. There he meets the Amerindians and Roberval's men carry boats on their shoulders at the top of the first fall to study the waterways upstream. Going back downstream a little later, a boat capsized and eight people were drowned. Back in the colony, ships arrived from France with fresh supplies, but also letters from François Ist who demanded their return to France because of the war.

Return home and death
On his arrival in the fall of 1543, Roberval learned that the Spaniards and the English were marching on Paris from the east and north of the kingdom. The following spring, the king assigned to La Rocque the city of Senlis, the last stronghold north of the capital, whose fortifications had to be repaired. La Rocque puts all the inhabitants of the region to work with many of the people who returned with him to Canada. In September 1544, Charles V decided to sign peace with François I, but two days later the English seized the stronghold of Boulogne-sur-Mer and continued their advance towards the capital. Francis I finally repelled the attackers by sending an armada of 150 ships, sowing destruction along the English coasts. La Rocque de Roberval and his regiment led the attack under the orders of Admiral d'Annebault.
As one of the king's military officers, the Sieur de Roberval was involved in all such conflicts until the Treaty of Cateau-Cambresis in 1559. Those who had not paid with their lives for their sovereigns on the battlefields, paid the monetary debts they had incurred during the numerous conflicts of the first half of the 16th century, or scrounged to pay the ransom of Francis I while he was detained in Spain. J-F de La Rocque lived at the expense of the army while, protected from his creditors by kings or their families (Allaire, 2013). Roberval was assassinated at the dawn of the Wars of Religion a month after the conspiracy of Amboise (March 17, 1560), on the occasion of the burial of a colleague in the Saints-Innocents cemetery in Paris on April 18, 1560.

Posterity
Having no children, Roberval had made the necessary arrangements and left the family patrimony in the hands of his sisters. The only possession he had not officially bequeathed (the Château de Roberval) was seized and auctioned for debts incurred some 40 years previously and it was his nephew who bought it. From the 17th to the 18th century, the castle of Roberval passed into the hands of great wealthy families in the La Marcks movement to which La Rocque had remained faithful. In 1784, the seigneury with its castle (and its archives) were bought by the Davène family, whose descendants still own it. Despite his military fame and his involvement in the Canadian expedition, La Rocque de Roberval had difficulty entering the Pantheon of 16th century explorers and colonizers, mainly because of his religious opinions that were anti-clerical and favorable to the Reformation. Its existence was reduced or even blackened at the time of the religious wars in France (1562–1598) and it was not until the nineteenth century to see it emerge weakly in historiography and after the 1960s so that we speak again of him in public historical literature.

In literature
Rabelais spoke of him as Robert Valbringue.  His marooning of Marguerite de la Roque de Roberval, his young relative, and her rescue, is recounted in novella 67 of the Heptaméron (1559) by Queen Marguerite of Navarre. André Thevet wrote on Jean-François de Roberval, including two versions of the legend of Marguerite de Roberval in Cosmographie universelle and Le Grand Insulaire et pilotage. Court poets Clément Marot and Michel d'Amboise dedicated works to him. A Protestant poem in Latin, "Robervalensis Epitaphium", is part of an anonymous collection of poems at the National Library in Paris. According to the dedication to Henry of Navarre by François Desprez, some of the costume woodcuts in Richard Breton's Recueil des Habits (Paris 1562) derive from Roberval's sketches.

References and notes
Bibliography
Bernard Allaire, La Rumeur Dorée: Roberval et l'Amérique, Montréal, La Presse, 2013
Bernard Allaire, "Jacques Cartier" et "J-F de La Rocque de Roberval" dans l'encyclopédie Canadienne, 2015 (online) [archive]
Biggar, H. P., A Collection of Documents relating to Jacques Cartier and the Sieur de Roberval, Ottawa, PAC, 1930.
Braudel, F. (dir.), Le monde de Jacques Cartier : l’aventure au XVIe siècle, Montréal, Libre-Expression, 1984.
Bibaud, Michel, Histoire du Canada, sous la domination française, imprimerie Lovell et Gibson, Montréal, 1843, pp. 6, 33–35, 39–50, 58
Morel, Emile, Jean-François de la Roque, Seigneur de Roberval, vice-roi du Canada, Paris, Leroux, 1893 (lire en ligne) [archive]
Collard, Jean-Claude, Roberval petit roi du Vimeu - Premier vice-roi du Canada, éditions La vague verte, 2008
Laverdière, Camil, Le sieur de Roberval, Chicoutimi, les Éditions JCL. 2005, 160 pages.
Thevet, André, Les singularitez de la France Antarctique…, Paris 1558.
Lestringant, Franck. et Laborie, J-C., Histoire d’André Thevet Angoumoisin de deux voyages par lui faits aux Indes Australes et Occidentales, édition critique par, J-C, Genève, Droz, 2006.
d’Albret de Navarre, Marguerite, L’Heptaméron, Paris, Boaistuau, (1549), 1558.
La Roque de Roquebrune, Robert, Roberval et sa colonie canadienne au XVIe siècle, dans Outre-Mers. Revue d'histoire, 1956, no 151, pp. 125–137

1495 births
1560 deaths
People from Carcassonne
Explorers of Canada
French explorers of North America
People of New France
16th century in Canada
French Calvinist and Reformed Christians
16th-century Protestant martyrs
Roberval, Quebec
Date of birth uncertain